Orbisonia is a borough in Huntingdon County, Pennsylvania, United States. The population was 428 at the 2010 census.



Geography
Orbisonia is located in southeastern Huntingdon County at  (40.243345, -77.893362), on the northeastern side of Blacklog Creek, a tributary of Aughwick Creek and part of the Juniata River watershed. Orbisonia is bordered to the southwest by Rockhill, across Blacklog Creek. Blacklog Mountain overlooks the borough to the east.

U.S. Route 522 passes through Orbisonia, leading north  to Mount Union and south  to Shade Gap.

Demographics

At the 2000 census there were 425 people, 198 households, and 109 families residing in the borough. The racial makeup of the borough was 99.06% White, 0.24% African American, 0.24% Native American, and 0.47% from two or more races. Hispanic or Latino of any race were 0.47%.

There were 198 households, 24.2% had children under the age of 18 living with them, 42.4% were married couples living together, 8.6% had a female householder with no husband present, and 44.9% were non-families. 44.4% of households were made up of individuals, and 29.8% were one person aged 65 or older. The average household size was 2.15 and the average family size was 3.00.

In the borough, the population was spread out, with 22.8% under the age of 18, 4.7% from 18 to 24, 24.0% from 25 to 44, 21.4% from 45 to 64, and 27.1% 65 or older. The median age was 44 years. For every 100 females, there were 90.6 males. For every 100 females age 18 and over, there were 82.2 males.

The median household income was $25,000 and the median family income  was $38,333. Males had a median income of $31,250 versus $20,625 for females. The per capita income for the borough was $16,911. About 5.8% of families and 11.0% of the population were below the poverty line, including 7.4% of those under age 18 and 19.8% of those age 65 or over.

Public services

Emergency services
 Orbisonia and Rockhill Volunteer Fire Company

Health care
 Southern Huntingdon County Medical Center

Postal services
 Orbisonia Post Office

Non-profit organizations
 Orbisonia Lions Club
 Orbisonia Food Pantry

See also

 List of boroughs in Pennsylvania

References

External links

Populated places established in 1850
Boroughs in Huntingdon County, Pennsylvania
1850 establishments in Pennsylvania